Ramith Rambukwella (born 8 September 1991) is a professional Sri Lankan first-class cricketer who plays for Tamil Union Cricket and Athletic Club and Twenty20 Internationals for Sri Lanka national side. His father Keheliya Rambukwella is a minister and a member of parliament in Sri Lankan government.

Domestic career
In April 2018, he was named in Galle's squad for the 2018 Super Provincial One Day Tournament. In August 2018, he was named in Dambulla's squad the 2018 SLC T20 League.

International career
He made his Twenty20 International (T20I) debut against New Zealand on 21 November 2013 as the 50th T20I cap for Sri Lanka.

Rambukwella, who was in UK with the Sri Lanka A team in July 2016, was called up to Sri Lanka's squad for the T20I against England on 5 July 2016.

Personal life
Rambukwella is married to his longtime partner Natali, where the wedding was celebrated on 3 May 2017 in Galle Face Hotel.

Arrest and misbehavior
On 18 July 2013, Rambukwella was fined with 50% of his tour fee of the West Indies after causing mild panic on a flight by attempting to open the cabin door at 35,000 feet. He was drunk at that time, where he had mistaken the cabin door for the lavatory, and suggested he had been half-asleep, which is what prompted the error.

In September 2013, he was arrested following a car accident in Colombo, which struck a wall. He was arrested again in March 2018, for involving in drunk driving and assault.

References

External links
 

1991 births
Living people
Sri Lankan cricketers
Sri Lanka Twenty20 International cricketers
Tamil Union Cricket and Athletic Club cricketers
People from Kandy
Asian Games medalists in cricket
Cricketers at the 2014 Asian Games
Ruhuna Royals cricketers
Colombo Commandos cricketers
Jaffna District cricketers
Asian Games gold medalists for Sri Lanka
Medalists at the 2014 Asian Games